The 2021–22 season is AFC Wimbledon's 20th year in their history and sixth consecutive season back in League One. Along with the league, the club will also compete in the FA Cup, the EFL Cup and the 2021–22 EFL Trophy. The season covers the period from 1 July 2021 to 30 June 2022.

Pre-season friendlies
AFC Wimbledon confirmed friendly matches against Brentford, Kingstonian, Metropolitan Police, Hampton & Richmond Borough, Dartford and Woking as part of their pre-season preparations.

Competitions

League One

League table

Results summary

Results by matchday

Matches
AFC Wimbledon's fixtures were announced on 24 June 2021.

FA Cup

AFC Wimbledon were drawn at home to Guiseley in the first round, Cheltenham Town in the second round and away to Boreham Wood in the third round.

EFL Cup

AFC Wimbledon were drawn away to Charlton Athletic in the first round Northampton Town in the second round and Arsenal in the third round.

EFL Trophy

AFC Wimbledon were drawn into Southern Group B alongside Crystal Palace U21s, Portsmouth and Sutton United.

Transfers

Transfers in

Loans in

Loans out

Transfers out

Statistics

|}

Goals record

Disciplinary record

References

AFC Wimbledon
AFC Wimbledon seasons
AFC Wimbledon
AFC Wimbledon